The Minor League Baseball Organization of the Year Award, formerly known as the John H. Johnson President's Award or simply the President's Award, is presented annually by Minor League Baseball (MiLB) to recognize "a 'complete' baseball franchise that has demonstrated franchise stability and significant contributions to its community, league, and the baseball industry." It is considered MiLB's top honor and is usually awarded during baseball's Winter Meetings. The award, first issued in 1974, was created by MiLB president Hank Peters as the President's Award. It was renamed in 1988 in honor of John H. Johnson, who served as the president of Minor League Baseball from 1979 until his death in January 1988. It became known as the MiLB Organization of the Year Award in 2021 after Major League Baseball assumed control of the minor leagues. 

Forty-two teams have won the award. The Albuquerque Dukes, Billings Mustangs, Durham Bulls, Iowa Cubs, Rochester Red Wings, and Tacoma Rainiers have each won the award twice, more than any other teams. International League franchises have won the award nine times, more than any other league, followed by the Pacific Coast League (8); the American Association and Midwest League (5); the Eastern League (4); the Northwest League, Pioneer League, and Texas League (3); the California League and Carolina League (2); and the Appalachian League, Mexican League, South Atlantic League, and Southern League (1). Twenty-three winners have competed at the Triple-A classification level, more than any other class, followed by Double-A and Single-A/Class A (8); Rookie (4); High-A/Class A-Advanced (3); and Class A Short Season (2).

Winners

References
Specific

General

Organization
Awards established in 1974